The following lists events that happened during 1907 in South Africa.

Incumbents
 Governor of the Cape of Good Hope and High Commissioner for Southern Africa:Walter Hely-Hutchinson.
 Governor of the Colony of Natal: Matthew Nathan.
 Prime Minister of the Cape of Good Hope: Leander Starr Jameson.
 Prime Minister of the Colony of Natal: Frederick Robert Moor.
 Prime Minister of the Orange River Colony: Hamilton John Goold-Adams.
 Prime Minister of the Transvaal Colony: Louis Botha.

Events

March
 22 – The Transvaal Asiatic Registration Act is passed in parliament, sparking protests by Indians.

July
 1 – The Orange River Colony gains autonomy as the Orange Free State.
Reggie walker winning gold in the Olympics

Births

 30 December – Geoffrey Cronjé founder of Apartheid

Deaths

Railways

Railway lines opened
 1 January – Cape Western – Misgund to Avontuur (Narrow gauge), .
 13 March – Transvaal – Breyten to Ermelo, .
 18 April – Natal – Estcourt to Weenen (Narrow gauge), .
 15 May – Natal – Loskop to Winterton, .
 16 May – Cape Western – Mafeking to Buurman's Drift, .

 2 July – Free State – Modderpoort to Bethlehem, .
 5 July – Transvaal – Krugersdorp to Zeerust, .
 14 July – Cape Midland – Knysna to Templeman, .
 2 September – Natal – North Shepstone to South Shepstone, .
 25 September – Cape Midland – Mosselbaai to George, .

Locomotives
 The Cape Government Railways places a single experimental  Pacific three cylinder compound steam locomotive in service, based on the second series of its Karoo Class locomotives. In 1912 it will be designated Class Experimental 1 on the South African Railways (SAR).
 The Central South African Railways acquires a single self-contained Railmotor, a passenger coach that is an integral part of the locomotive itself, for its railmotor passenger service that had been introduced in 1906.
 The Natal Government Railways places six 4-6-2 Pacific type narrow gauge tank steam locomotives in service. By 1930 they will be designated Class NG3 on the SAR.

References

 
South Africa
Years in South Africa